Clannad is a visual novel developed by Key and published by VisualArt's in 2004. The story follows Tomoya Okazaki, a discontented high school student whose life changes when he meets a girl one year older than him named Nagisa Furukawa. It was adapted by Toei Animation into an animated film in 2007 directed by Osamu Dezaki with music direction by Yoshichika Inomata. Kyoto Animation also adapted it into two anime television series consisting of 49 episodes broadcast between 2007 and 2009, including two original video animation episodes released in 2008 and 2009, directed by Tatsuya Ishihara with music direction by Shinji Orito. The discography of Clannad and its anime adaptations consists of two studio albums, four singles, two soundtracks, and four remix albums.

The core of the discography is the two original soundtrack albums. The visual novel's soundtrack, which was also used for both anime series, was produced by Key Sounds Label and released in 2004. The music on the soundtrack was composed and arranged by Jun Maeda, Shinji Orito and Magome Togoshi. A soundtrack for the animated film was released in 2007 by Frontier Works. The music on the film soundtrack was mainly composed and arranged by Yoshichika Inomata. Two studio image song albums were released for the visual novel in 2003 and 2004. Three remix albums were released for the visual novel in 2004 and 2005, and a remix album was released for the second anime series in 2008. Four singles were released in 2007 and 2008, two for the film, and one each for both anime series.

Albums

Sorarado
 is an image album for the Clannad visual novel, and was first released on December 28, 2003 in Japan by Key Sounds Label bearing the catalog number KSLA-0009. The album contains one disc with six tracks sung by Riya that sample tunes from background music featured in the Clannad Original Soundtrack. The album is composed, arranged, and produced by Shinji Orito, Magome Togoshi, Riya, Manyo, and Takumaru.

Mabinogi
Mabinogi is an arrange album which contains a selection of songs from the visual novel Clannad, remixed by Hideki Higuchi. This album was released as a bonus item, included with the limited edition first printing of the PC version of the game released on April 28, 2004 by Key Sounds Label bearing the catalog number KSLA-0010, though this was later corrected to KSLA-0011. This album was not released for individual sale. Of the nine tracks on the one-disc album, only the first eight were arranged versions of background music found in the game. In 2014, it was re-released through Sekai Project's Kickstarter for the official English translation of the game. It was available as part of the Clannad Kickstarter Limited Box, a digital only addition to some tiers, and as a separate digital only Kickstarter add-on.

Clannad Original Soundtrack
The Clannad Original Soundtrack, from the visual novel Clannad, was first released on August 13, 2004 in Japan by Key Sounds Label bearing the catalog numbers KSLA-0012—0014. The soundtrack contains three discs totaling fifty-six songs composed, arranged, and produced by Jun Maeda, Shinji Orito, and Magome Togoshi. Tracks nine through nineteen on disc three are considered to be bonus tracks. Riya provides vocals for three songs, "Mag Mell", "-Kage Futatsu-", and "Chiisana Tenohira"; Lia provides vocals for the song "Ana".

Sorarado Append
 is an image album for the Clannad visual novel, and was first released on December 28, 2004 in Japan by Key Sounds Label bearing the catalog number KSLA-0015. The album is a follow-up to the earlier released Sorarado, and contains one disc with four tracks sung by Riya that sample tunes from background music featured in the Clannad Original Soundtrack. The album is composed, arranged, and produced by Jun Maeda, Magome Togoshi, Manyo, and Takumaru.

-Memento-
-Memento- is a remix album for the Clannad visual novel, and was first released on December 28, 2004 in Japan by Key Sounds Label bearing the catalog numbers KSLA-0016—0017. The album contains two discs with seventeen tracks remixed from background music featured on the Clannad Original Soundtrack. Riya provides vocals for four songs, "Mag Mell", "-Kage Futatsu-", "Chiisana Tenohira", and "Sakura Jokyoku"; Lia provides vocals for the song "Ana". Each track is arranged by a different person, three of which include Shinji Orito, Magome Togoshi, and OdiakeS.

Piano no Mori
 is a piano arrange album with songs taken from the Clannad and Tomoyo After: It's a Wonderful Life visual novels and arranged into piano versions. It was first released on December 29, 2005 in Japan by Key Sounds Label bearing the catalog number KSLA-0021. The album contains one disc with ten tracks; the first five songs are from Clannad while the last five are from Tomoyo After. The album is composed, and produced by Jun Maeda, Shinji Orito, Magome Togoshi, and Eufonius; all the tracks are arranged by Ryō Mizutsuki.

Clannad Film Soundtrack
The  is the soundtrack to the Clannad film released by Frontier Works on November 21, 2007 bearing the catalog number FCCM-0198. The album spans one disc with twenty-seven tracks featuring music composed by Yoshichika Inomata. Four songs are performed by Eufonius and sung by Riya, "Mag Mell (frequency⇒e Ver.)", "Marmelo (fildychrom)", "Marmelo (fildychrom La la la Ver.)", and "Chiisana Tenohira (Eufonius Ver.)"; the last song on the soundtrack, "Yakusoku", is sung by Lia.

"Toki o Kizamu Uta / Torch" Piano Arrange Disc
"Toki o Kizamu Uta / Torch" Piano Arrange Disc is a piano arrange album for the Clannad After Story anime series by Kyoto Animation which was released on December 28, 2008 at Comiket 75 in Japan by Key Sounds Label bearing the catalog number KSLC-0003. The album contains one disc with two tracks, which are piano arrange versions of the opening and ending themes from the anime version. The album is composed, arranged, and produced by Jun Maeda, Shinji Orito, and Ryō Mizutsuki. The album came bundled with the "Toki o Kizamu Uta / Torch" piano sheet music book.

Singles

Mag Mell
 is a maxi single arranged by the J-pop band Eufonius first released in Japan on July 14, 2007 by Frontier Works. The music CD was only available to those who have already pre-ordered film tickets. The CD contains three tracks, two theme songs sung by Riya for the Clannad film, and an instrumental version of track one.

Yakusoku
 is an image song single for the Clannad film by Lia originally released at Comiket 72 on August 17, 2007, produced by Frontier Works. The music CD was only available to those who bought film tickets early for the Clannad film. The single contains four tracks, with only the first song "Yakusoku" sung by Lia while tracks two and three are background music from the Clannad Film Soundtrack, and the final track is an instrumental version of "Promise".

Mag Mell / Dango Daikazoku
 is a single for the Clannad anime series by Kyoto Animation which was released on October 26, 2007 in Japan by Key Sounds Label bearing the catalog number KSLA-0036. The single contains the opening and ending themes from the anime version in full length, TV length, and off-vocal versions, along with a bonus remix track of the song "Shōjo no Gensō" from the earlier Sorarado image album released in 2003. The opening theme "Mag Mell (cuckool mix 2007)" is performed by Eufonius and sung by Riya, who also sings "Shōjo no Gensō". The ending theme "Dango Daikazoku" is sung by Chata. The single is composed, arranged, and produced by Jun Maeda, Magome Togoshi, Hajime Kikuchi, Takumaru, and ZTS.

Toki o Kizamu Uta / Torch
 / Torch" is a single for the Clannad After Story anime series by Kyoto Animation which was released on November 14, 2008 in Japan by Key Sounds Label bearing the catalog number KSLA-0044. The single contains the opening and ending themes from the anime version in full length, TV length, and off-vocal versions; the vocal songs are sung by Lia. The single is composed, arranged, and produced by Jun Maeda, Shinji Orito, Kai, Anant-Garde Eyes, and Kentarō Fukushi. The single achieved a daily ranking of No. 3 the day of its release on Japan's Oricon charts for singles, and ranked in at No. 13 in the weekly singles charts for the week of November 16, 2008. The single dropped to No. 19 on the weekly singles charts for the week of November 23, 2008. By November 26, 2008, the single had sold 15,765 units. The total reported sales of the single reached 21,706 units.

Charts

References

Anime soundtracks
Soundtracks
Film soundtracks
Discographies of Japanese artists
Key Sounds Label
Lists of albums
Video game soundtracks